Lash of the West is an American Western drama series that aired on ABC on Sunday night at 6:30 p.m Eastern time from January 4, 1953, to April 26, 1953. The series was essentially put together using clips from 1940s B-grade Western movies. In the summer of 1953, the program moved to 10:15-10:30 a.m. on Saturdays.

Synopsis
1940s western movie star Lash LaRue appeared at the opening of each episode in a modern-day marshal's office and would then tell a story about his grandfather, who looked just like him, was also a marshal, and also named Lash LaRue. Cliff Taylor, as Flapjack helped to present the episodes. The scene then shifted to clips of LaRue's old movies in which LaRue's "granddad" went after bad guys with his sidekick Fuzzy Q. Jones.

Production and distribution
The program was produced by Ron Ormond and distributed nationally by Guild Films, Incorporated.

In 1954, 39 episodes of Lash of the West were sold to TV stations in Los Angeles; Memphis, Tennessee; Tulsa, Oklahoma; and Stockton, California.

Cast
Lash LaRue as Lash LaRue
Al St. John as Fuzzy Q. Jones
Cliff Taylor as Flapjack
Taylor Strattan as John Martin

References

American Broadcasting Company original programming
1953 American television series debuts
1953 American television series endings
1950s Western (genre) television series